Osirus may refer to:

 Osirus (album) (2005), final album from Ol' Dirty Bastard before his death in 2004
 Ol' Dirty Bastard, as a nickname for the American rapper

See also
 Osiris, the Egyptian god, as a misspelling